Maria Di Benedetto may refer to:
Maria Domenica Di Benedetto (born 1953), Italian electrical engineer specializing in control theory
Maria-Gabriella Di Benedetto (born 1958), Italian electrical engineer specializing in speech processing and wireless communications

See also
Père Marie-Benoît, known in Italian as Maria Benedetto (1895–1990), Catholic monk who smuggled thousands of Jews from Nazi-occupied France
Di Benedetto, other people with the same surname